Bhokardan Assembly constituency is one of the 288 Vidhan Sabha (legislative assembly) constituencies of Maharashtra state in western India.

Overview
Bhokardan (constituency number 103) is one of the five Vidhan Sabha constituencies located in Jalna district. It covers the entire Jafferabad tehsil and part of Bhokardan tehsil of this district.

Bhokardan is part of the Jalna Lok Sabha constituency along with five other Vidhan Sabha segments, namely Jalna and Badnapur in Jalna district and Silod, Phulambri and Paithan in Aurangabad district.

Members of Legislative Assembly
 1985: Santoshrao Waluba Daspute , INC
 1990: Raosaheb Dadarao Danve, BJP
 1995: Raosaheb Dadarao Danve, BJP
 1999: Vithalrao Anna Sapkal ,  BJP
 2004: Chandrakant Pundlikrao Danve, NCP
 2009: Chandrakant Pundlikrao Danve, NCP
 2014: Santosh Raosaheb Danve , BJP
 2019: Santosh Raosaheb Danve , BJP

Election results

Assembly Elections 2004

Assembly Elections 2009

Assembly Elections 2014

See also
 Bhokardan
 List of constituencies of Maharashtra Vidhan Sabha

References

Assembly constituencies of Maharashtra